The 2015 ICC Americas Under-19 Championship was an international cricket tournament held in Bermuda, from 5 to 11 July 2015. It was the eighth edition of the ICC Americas Under-19 Championship, and the first held in Bermuda since the inaugural tournament in 2001.

Canada won the title for a fifth time, finishing the tournament undefeated to qualify directly for the 2016 Under-19 World Cup. The United States were the runner-up, finishing ahead of Bermuda on net run rate to proceed to the 2015 World Cup Qualifier, where the winner will also qualify for the World Cup. The tournament was originally going to involve a fourth team, Suriname, which would have been making its maiden appearance. However, Suriname withdrew from the tournament after failing to secure transit visas for its players.

Teams 
The 2015 tournament was originally going to feature four teams, one more than the previous tournament in Canada. Suriname, which withdrew, qualified by winning the 2014 Division Two tournament, and would have made its tournament debut, with teams at the tournament being the same as at the senior-level  2015 Americas Twenty20 Championship in Indiana. Because of the lateness of Suriname's withdrawal, the Division Two runner-up, Argentina, was unable to be invited as a replacement.

Preparation
The United States named their 14-man squad for the tournament in early June, following a training camp in Los Angeles. The team was coached by Thiru Kumaran, a former Indian ODI representative and ex-assistant coach of the U.S. senior national side.

Fixtures

Statistics

Most runs
The top five runscorers are included in this table, ranked by runs scored and then by batting average.

Source: CricHQ

Most wickets

The top five wicket takers are listed in this table, ranked by wickets taken and then by bowling average.

Source: CricHQ

References 

Under-19 regional cricket tournaments
International cricket competitions in 2015
2015 in Bermudian sport
International cricket competitions in Bermuda